The 2017–18 UMass Lowell River Hawks women's basketball team will represent the University of Massachusetts Lowell during the 2017–18 NCAA Division I women's basketball season. The River Hawks are led by fourth year head coach Jenerrie Harris and will once again play most their home games in the Costello Athletic Center while select games will be played in the Tsongas Center at UMass Lowell and were members of the America East Conference. They finished the season 4–26, 1–15 in America East play to finish in last place. They lost in the first round of the America East women's tournament to UMBC.

On March 5, Jenerrie Harris's contract was not renewed. She finished at UMass Lowell with a 4 year record of 25–91. On April 12, former Boston College assistant coach Tom Garrick was named the next head coach of the River Hawks.

Media
All non-televised home games and conference road games will stream on either ESPN3 or AmericaEast.tv. Most road games will stream on the opponents website.

Roster

Schedule

|-
!colspan=9 style=| Non-conference regular season

|-
!colspan=9 style=| America East regular Season

|-
!colspan=9 style=| America East tournament

See also
 2017–18 UMass Lowell River Hawks men's basketball team

References

UMass Lowell River Hawks women's basketball seasons
UMass Lowell
UMass Lowell River Hawks women's basketball
UMass Lowell River Hawks women's basketball